William Franklin Herrin (August 7, 1854 – February 28, 1927) was an American lawyer, businessman, banker and real estate developer.

Biography
Herrin assisted William Sharon (1821-1885) in his acrimonious divorce from his wife Sarah. He subsequently became Chief Counsel for the Sharon estate and the Spring Valley Company. Later, he served as Chief Counsel of the Southern Pacific Railroad, where he was critical of government overregulations. He allegedly nominated gubernatorial candidates, supreme court justices, and appellate court judges. In 1908, in the San Francisco Call, James W. Rea, a former associate, accused him and Jere Burke of corruption over bonds of the San Jose and Los Gatos Interurban Railroad Company.

In 1900, together with Burton E. Green (1868-1965), Charles A. Canfield (1848-1913), Max Whittier (1867–1928), Frank H. Buck (1887-1942), Henry E. Huntington (1850-1927), William G. Kerckhoff (1856–1929), W.S. Porter and Frank H. Balch, known as the Amalgamated Oil Company, he purchased Rancho Rodeo de las Aguas from Henry Hammel and Andrew H. Denker and renamed it Morocco Junction. After drilling for oil and only finding water, they reorganized their business into the Rodeo Land and Water Company to develop a new residential town later known as Beverly Hills, California.

He served on the Board of Directors of Wells Fargo from 1904 to 1918. From 1904 to 1906, he worked with John Muir to convince Congress to include the Yosemite Valley as part of the Yosemite National Park. He was a member of the Bohemian Club and the Committee of Fifty (1906).

Personal life
Herrin resided at 2530 Broadway at Scott Street in San Francisco, California, in a house designed by architect Julius E. Krafft.

Bibliography

References

External links

1854 births
1927 deaths
Southern Pacific Railroad people
American real estate businesspeople
Wells Fargo employees
19th-century American lawyers